Early general elections were held in Thailand on 17 November 1996. The result was a victory for the New Aspiration Party, which won 125 of the 393 seats, despite winning fewer votes than the Democrat Party. Voter turnout was 62.4%.

Background 
The previous general elections had been held in July 1995 and resulted in Banharn Silpa-archa of the Thai Nation Party becoming Prime Minister. However, concerns about Banharn's ability to ensure a strong economy grew after several unpopular cabinet appointments, including the appointment of Surakiart Sathirathai as Finance Minister, a move that met with the disapproval of the business community due to the sharp economic downturn that followed. A growing number of other ministers and deputy ministers were accused of corruption and manipulating the stock exchange for personal profit.

A motion of no confidence was put forward in the House of Representatives in September 1996. Most of the Thai Nation Party's coalition partners deserted the government during the debates. Although they eventually voted for against the motion, they demanded Banharn resign within seven days of the vote. The threats of defection by two coalition partners — the New Aspiration Party (NAP) and the Leading Thai Party — forced Banharn to agree to resign. The terms demanded that he step down and a new cabinet be formed with NAP leader Chavalit Yongchaiyudh as head of government. However, although Banharn agreed to step down, he dissolved the House of Representatives rather than allowing Chavalit to become Prime Minister.

Campaign
MPs changing parties prior to the elections resulted in the consolidation of the political field into four major parties, and a total of 2,310 candidates from 13 political parties contested the elections.

National issues were more important to urban voters and less important to rural voters. The electorate's biggest concern was the economic slowdown, but the economic platforms of the major parties were not significantly different. Most parties focused on fiscal discipline and reducing the current account deficit.

Conduct
PollWatch called the legitimacy of the election into question and refused to ratify the results. They announced that the elections could not have been clean and fair due to the vast amounts of money used during the election and the abuse of power, intimidation, and violence against voters, as well as open cheating on election day by government officials.

The elections saw a large increase in the amount of money spent on campaigns and an increase in vote-buying. PollWatch estimated that candidates spent around 20 to 30 billion baht on buying votes, and candidates reportedly paid between 100 and 1,500 baht for a single vote, with some even paid 5,000 baht. Vote buying tended to be focused on areas where influence could be purchased relatively cheaply, and most of the vote-buying occurred in the north-east region. Of the 5,294 complaints PollWatch received about malpractice, 2,730 of them were related to vote-buying.

Results
The results showed a close two-way race between the NAP and the Democrat Party. Although the Democrats received the most votes and won 123 seats, the NAP won 125 seats and became the largest party in the House of Representatives. 60% of the MPs were re-elected, and only 22 of the 393 elected members were women. Nearly three-quarters of had bachelor’s degrees or higher, with 58% being under 50 years old.

The results showed a regionalization of support for different parties. The NAP dominated in the north-east, where Chavalit had established a strong base during his period as Army Commander, building ties with the officials and business leaders. The South has long been a Democratic stronghold, with the Democrats having cultivated strong ties with young Muslim voters. Support in Bangkok shifted from the Palang Dharma Party to the Democrats, who gained the support of the city's elite and provincial voters and won 29 of the city's 37 seats.

Aftermath
Chavalit became Prime Minister, leading a coalition government consisting of the National Development Party, Social Action Party, Thai Citizens' Party, Seritham Party and Mass Party.

References

Thailand
General
General election
Elections in Thailand